Ingo Steinhöfel (born 29 May 1967 in Plauen, Saxony, East Germany), is a former German weightlifter who competed at five Olympics from 1988 to 2004. He won a silver medal in the middleweight class at the 1988 Olympics.

He is, jointly with fellow (East) German Ronny Weller, the second weightlifter to compete at five Olympics. The first was Hungarian Imre Földi from 1960 to 1976.

At the world championships, he came 3rd in the 1987 middleweight class (345.0 kg), 3rd in the 1989 light-heavyweight class (377.5 kg) and 2nd in the 1994 middleweight class (362.5 kg).

At the European championships, he came 3rd in the 1989 light-heavyweight class (377.5 kg); 2nd in the 1997 middleweight class (350.0 kg).

See also
List of athletes with the most appearances at Olympic Games

References
 
 

1967 births
Living people
People from Plauen
German male weightlifters
Olympic weightlifters of East Germany
Olympic weightlifters of Germany
Olympic silver medalists for East Germany
Weightlifters at the 1988 Summer Olympics
Weightlifters at the 1992 Summer Olympics
Weightlifters at the 1996 Summer Olympics
Weightlifters at the 2000 Summer Olympics
Weightlifters at the 2004 Summer Olympics
Olympic medalists in weightlifting
Medalists at the 1988 Summer Olympics
Sportspeople from Saxony